The women's 10,000 metres walk event at the 2014 World Junior Championships in Athletics was held in Eugene, Oregon, USA, at Hayward Field on 23 July.

Medalists

Records

Results

Final
23 July
Start time: 10:28  Temperature: 14 °C  Humidity: 88 %

Note:
IAAF Rule 230.6(a) - Repeated failure to comply with the definition of Race Walking

Intermediate times:
1000m: 4:24.56 Anežka Drahotová
2000m: 8:39.46 Anežka Drahotová
3000m: 12:50.67 Anežka Drahotová
4000m: 17:04.34 Anežka Drahotová
5000m: 21:21.15 Anežka Drahotová
6000m: 25:39.66 Anežka Drahotová
7000m: 29:57.03 Anežka Drahotová
8000m: 34:17.93 Anežka Drahotová
9000m: 38:36.45 Anežka Drahotová

Participation
According to an unofficial count, 37 athletes from 26 countries participated in the event.

References

External links
 WJC14 10000 metres walk schedule

10,000 metres walk
Racewalking at the World Athletics U20 Championships
2014 in women's athletics